Grevillea incrassata is a species of flowering plant in the family Proteaceae and is endemic to inland south-western Western Australia. It is an erect shrub with crowded cylindrical or narrowly linear leaves and clusters of bright yellow flowers.

Description

Taxonomy
Grevillea incrassata was first formally described in 1904 by Ludwig Diels in Ernst Georg Pritzel's Botanische Jahrbücher für Systematik, Pflanzengeschichte und Pflanzengeographie. The specific epithet (incrassata) means "flattened", referring to the leaves.

Distribution and habitat
This grevillea grows in scrub mallee on sandplains  between Narembeen, Southern Cross, Lake King and Peak Charles National Park in the Avon Wheatbelt, Coolgardie, Esperance Plains and Mallee bioregions of inland south-western Western Australia.

Conservation status
Grevillea incrassata is listed as "not threatened" by the Government of Western Australia Department of Biodiversity, Conservation and Attractions.

See also
 List of Grevillea species

References

incrassata
Proteales of Australia
Eudicots of Western Australia
Taxa named by Ludwig Diels
Plants described in 1904